This is a list of countries by past military expenditure, starting 1987.

Methodology
Figures for the tables below are provided by the Stockholm International Peace Research Institute (SIPRI) database. They are presented in millions of United States dollars in current prices, converted at the exchange rate for the given year. If there is no data for a particular year, a cell is left blank. Although the database includes statistics for over 150 countries, per SIPRI's Terms and Condition permission is needed to directly reproduce more than 10% of the database.

1987–1989

* indicates "Military of COUNTRY" links.

1990–1999

* indicates "Military of COUNTRY" links.

2000–2009

* indicates "Military of COUNTRY" links.

2010–2019

* indicates "Military of COUNTRY" links.

See also
Military budget
List of countries by military expenditures
List of countries by military expenditure per capita

References

Expenditures
Military
Military economics
Military budgets